Liechtenstein competed at the Summer Olympic Games for the first time at the 1936 Summer Olympics in Berlin, Germany. Six male competitors took part in five events in three sports. It was only at these games that Liechtenstein realized their flag was identical to that of Haiti, prompting Liechtenstein in 1937 to add the crown found in their current flag.  This modified design was adopted on June 24, 1937.

Athletics

Liechtenstein held trials for its inaugural Olympic athletics team in 1936, featuring Xaver Frick and Oskar Ospelt. Frick won the races over 200, 400, and 800 metres, while Ospelt won the 100m and the discus and javelin throws.
Men
Track & road events

Field events

Cycling

Road

Shooting

Men

References

External links
Official Olympic Reports

Nations at the 1936 Summer Olympics
1936
1936 in Liechtenstein